Trevor Jacob (born August 6, 1993) is an American snowboard cross competitor, extreme sports athlete, YouTuber, and former aircraft pilot.  He represented the United States in snowboarding in the 2014 Winter Olympics. In December 2021, he posted a YouTube video in which he parachutes out of a light aircraft claiming engine failure. The Federal Aviation Administration revoked his pilot certificate after determining that he had crashed the plane for the sole purpose of filming it.

Athletic career
A native of Mammoth Lakes, California, Jacob competed at the 2014 Winter Olympics in Sochi, Russia. He made it to the semifinal of the men's snowboard cross, where he failed to qualify for the final. He lost by inches to fellow American Alex Deibold, who went on to earn the bronze medal. Jacob ultimately finished 9th.

Jacob competed in snowboard cross at the Winter X Games in 2014, 2015, and 2016, with a best finish of 5th place in the 2016 competition.

In addition to snowboarding, Jacob has participated in skateboarding, surfing, BMX riding, motocross and mixed martial arts, and was part of Travis Pastrana's Nitro Circus collective.

YouTube 
Jacob produces videos for YouTube and has become known for skydiving, aviation and snowboarding content. By January 2022, his YouTube channel had over 100,000 subscribers.

Airplane crash

Jacob owned a Taylorcraft BL-65, a 1940 vintage single-engine light aircraft, registration N29508. On November 24, 2021, he took off from Lompoc Airport alone, claiming that he was flying to Mammoth Mountain to spread ashes of his friend Johnny Strange. The aircraft was described by sources at Lompoc Airport as "in need of major maintenance." Unusually for him when piloting, indeed for pilots of most civil aircraft, Jacob wore a bulky skydiving parachute, a style that is awkward to wear in a small Taylorcraft with standard seats. The aircraft was outfitted with several digital cameras to film the flight and Jacob carried a selfie stick.

During the flight, the engine stopped running and Jacob parachuted to the ground, suffering minor injuries on landing. The unoccupied aircraft crashed into unpopulated scrubland in Los Padres National Forest near New Cuyama, California, and was substantially damaged. Jacob walked to the crash site before hiking out and saying that the engine had failed.

A month later, Jacob released an edited video depicting many of these events on his YouTube channel. However it does not show the aircraft controls nor engine instruments when the engine stops running. Jacob is also not seen carrying out basic aviation emergency procedures such as trying to restart the engine, contacting air traffic control, or initiating a forced landing despite potential landing sites being visible. These and other unusual behaviors led to skepticism from the aviation community, who suspected that the crash was a deliberate publicity stunt. The Federal Aviation Administration (FAA) and National Transportation Safety Board (NTSB) both launched investigations although the NTSB does not normally investigate off-airport general aviation crashes that do not involve serious injuries to persons, flight control problems, or substantial damage to property other than the aircraft itself.

Jacob denied having purposefully left the aircraft to crash, saying that "People can believe whatever they choose."

In April 2022, the FAA determined that he had indeed abandoned the aircraft solely to film the crash. The FAA cited his opening of the cabin door prior to the purported engine failure; the lack of any attempt to execute an emergency landing, contact air traffic control, or restart the engine; and his personal unsupervised recovery of the onboard cameras and the aircraft wreckage, which he allegedly disposed of. The FAA revoked his private pilot certificate and ruled that he will not be permitted to apply for a new certificate for one year, stating that "your flight … [was] careless or reckless so as to endanger life or property of another".

References

External links 
 
 
 
 
 
 Profile at ESPN

1993 births
Living people
Snowboarders at the 2014 Winter Olympics
Olympic snowboarders of the United States
People from Mammoth Lakes, California
People from West Hills, Los Angeles
American YouTubers
YouTube controversies